The 2016 Intrust Super Premiership season consists of 25 regular season round starting on Saturday, March 5, 2016, and ending on Saturday, 24 September 2016 with the Grand Final

Regular season

Round 1 

Intrust Super Premiership